4-Hydroxyphenylacetic acid is a chemical compound found in olive oil and beer.

Synthesis 
4-Hydroxyphenylacetic acid is obtained by reducing 4-hydroxymandelic acid with elemental phosphorus and iodine.

Uses
In industry, 4-hydroxyphenylacetic acid is an intermediate used to synthesize atenolol, 3,4-dihydroxyphenylacetic acid, and coclaurine.

References 

Phenols
Acetic acids
Hydroxy acids